Benjamin Hoskins Paddock Jr. (November 1, 1926 – January 18, 1998) was an American bank robber and con man who was on the FBI Ten Most Wanted Fugitives list from 1969 to 1977. He is the father of Stephen Paddock who committed the 2017 Las Vegas shooting that killed 60 people.

Early life 
Paddock was born at St. Nicholas Hospital in Sheboygan, Wisconsin on November 1, 1926, the son of Benjamin Hoskins Paddock Sr. and Olga Emelia Elizabeth Paddock (née Gunderson). He served in the United States Navy as an S2 (Seaman Second Class) during World War II.

In the 1950s in Tucson, Arizona, he operated a service station where he sold used cars. He later sold garbage disposal units under the name of Arizona Disposer Company and was connected with the operation of a nightclub in Tucson. In the late 1950s, Paddock volunteered with the Pima County Juvenile Probation Department and in 1959 was named special deputy to handle cases of wayward youths.

Criminal career 
In 1946, Paddock was convicted of ten counts of auto larceny and five counts of confidence game and was confined at the Illinois State Penitentiary until July 1951. In 1953, he was convicted of conspiracy in connection with a bad check passing operation and was again held at the Illinois State Penitentiary until August 1956. In one of his early arrests, he was found with a concealed revolver.

He was accused of robbing branches of the Valley National Bank of Arizona in Phoenix of $11,210  ($ in  dollars) on February 19, 1959, and of $9,285  ($ in  dollars) on January 29, 1960. He robbed another branch of $4,620  ($ in  dollars) on July 26, 1960. He was captured and then convicted for the third robbery in federal court in January 1961. During his arrest, he attempted to run down an FBI agent with his car. He was sentenced to 20 years in prison. On December 30, 1968, Paddock escaped from the Federal Correctional Institution, La Tuna in Anthony, Texas. A warrant for his arrest relating to his escape was issued on February 3, 1969, and he was placed on the FBI Ten Most Wanted list.

Most individuals who have been on the FBI Ten Most Wanted list are off the list in less than six months. Paddock was among those who were on the list the longest, being placed on the list on June 10, 1969, and removed on May 5, 1977. He had green eyes and wore contact lenses or glasses. He also had a scar above his right eyebrow and on his right knee and had a birthmark on his left ankle. He was described as a smooth talker, as arrogant and egotistical, liking cigars, cigarettes, and steaks. He also played bridge, enjoyed gambling, and watching sports, particularly baseball, for which he also worked as an umpire. During his criminal career, Paddock had numerous aliases, including Perry Archer, Benjamin J. Butler, Leo Genstein, Pat Paddock, and Patrick Benjamin Paddock. His nicknames included "Chromedome", "Old Baldy", and "Big Daddy".

After escaping prison in 1968, Paddock moved to Oregon where he took the name Bruce Warner Erickson. In Oregon, he worked as a contract trucker and in drug abuse rehabilitation. He was twice cited for traffic violations and in September 1977 he applied for and was granted a license to open a bingo parlor, but his identity was not uncovered. He then operated a bingo parlor for the Center for Education Reform, a non-profit organization based in Eugene, Oregon.

He was captured and arrested in early September 1978 in Springfield, Oregon, and was eventually released on parole.

In 1987, he was charged by the Oregon Attorney General with racketeering related to his bingo business and fraud for an illegal business he ran rolling back car odometers, but avoided a prison sentence by paying a $100,000 fine ($ in  dollars). Later in life, his involvement in bingo earned him the nickname, Bingo Bruce. During the last decade of his life, he lived quietly in Texas where he co-owned a car shop with his girlfriend.

Personal life and death 

Paddock married Dolores Irene Hudson (born January 10, 1928) in 1952, and they had four sons, Stephen (1953–2017), Patrick (born ), Bruce (1959-2020), and Eric (born 1960).

He died of a heart attack on January 18, 1998, in Arlington, Texas. He's buried at the Fort Gibson National Cemetery in Fort Gibson, Oklahoma.

His eldest son Stephen was the perpetrator of the 2017 Las Vegas shooting, the deadliest mass shooting by a lone gunman in North American history. Stephen was seven at the time of his father's arrest in the summer of 1960. "We didn't grow up under his influence," said his brother Eric. Their mother told them at the time that their father was dead.

Another son, Bruce, was arrested in North Hollywood on charges of possessing over 600 child pornography images. The charges were dropped in May 2018. On November 3, 2020, Bruce died due to health issues.

Notes

References 

1926 births
1998 deaths
20th-century American criminals
American bank robbers
American confidence tricksters
American escapees
United States Navy personnel of World War II
American prisoners and detainees
Businesspeople from Tucson, Arizona
Criminals from Wisconsin
FBI Ten Most Wanted Fugitives
Military personnel from Wisconsin
People from Sheboygan, Wisconsin
Prisoners and detainees of Illinois
Prisoners and detainees of the United States federal government
2017 Las Vegas shooting
20th-century American businesspeople